Ageniella is a genus of mud-nesting spider wasps in the family Pompilidae.

Description
Spider wasps in the genus Ageniella are smaller and thinner than many others, though these proportions are shared by the members of the tribe Ageniellini. Some individual species are reddish/pink, such as Ageniella conflicta. Similarly, most have banding on the wings. The wings can be smoky or clear, with the smoky ones having the banding and the clear ones lacking in this feature.

Habitat
Open areas, fields, meadows, sometimes near buildings.

Nests
Trumpet (or thimble) shaped, stocked with one spider each, and containing one egg.

Subgenera
 Ageniella (subgenus) 
 Ameragenia 
 Leucophrus 
 Nemagenia 
 Priophanes

References

Hymenoptera genera
Pepsinae